Víctor Arístides Batista Lemos (born October 2, 1979 in Tamayo) is a male volleyball player from the Dominican Republic, who won the bronze medal with the men's national team at the 2008 Pan American Cup in Winnipeg, Manitoba. He play as wing spiker.

Career
Playing with Bameso, he won two times the 2004 and 2005 USA Open Volleyball Championship, being awarded MVP and All-Tournament both times.

Víctor studied in Brigham Young University, majoring in Leisure Services Management. With the BYU Cougar's he won the 2004 NCAA National Collegiate Championship playing as a middle blocker, and winning the 2003-2004 VCA All-America Second Team, 2004-2005 All-MPSF Second Team and Asics/Volleyball Magazine and All-American Second Team, and finally 2005-2006 All-MPSF Honorable Mention; finishing with a .378 career hitting percentage, fourth in BYU history.

Played with Puerto Rican team Patriotas de Lares for the 2007 season. Next year joined the Turkish team Tokat Plevne Belediye. Later same season, joined the A2 Italian team Samgas Crema to play the 2008/2009 season.

Returned to Puerto Rican LVSM with Indios de Mayagüez for the 2008 season, and Los Caribes de San Sebastian for the 2009/2010 season.

Joined for the 2009/2010 the Spanish team CAI Voleibol Teruel, the 2010 Spanish Superliga. The next year, Batista played with his friend and countrymate José Miguel Cáceres. Víctor win MVP awards for his performances during the regular season and the playoffs. And won the 2011 King's Cup and the Superliga.

Clubs
  Bameso (1998–2005)
  Patriotas de Lares (2007)
  Tokat Plevne Belediye (2008–2009)
  Indios de Mayagüez (2008)
  Samgas Crema (2008–2009)
  Caribes de San Sebastián (2009)
  CAI Voleibol Teruel (2009–2011)
  GFCO Ajaccio (2011-2012)
  VfB Friedrichshafen (2012-2013)
  Maccabi Tel Aviv (2013-2014)

Awards

Individuals
 2004 USA Open Volleyball Championship "Most Valuable Player"
 2005 USA Open Volleyball Championship "Most Valuable Player"
 2011 Spanish Superliga Final Series "Most Valuable Player"

College
 2004 AVCA All-America Second Team
 2005 All-MPSF Second Team
 2005 Asics/Volleyball Magazine All-American Second Team
 2006 All-MPSF Honorable Mention

Clubs
 2004 USA Open Volleyball Championship -  Champion, with Bameso
 2005 USA Open Volleyball Championship -  Champion, with Bameso
 2010 Spanish Superliga -  Champion, with CAI Voleibol Teruel
 2011 Spanish King's Cup -  Champion, with CAI Voleibol Teruel
 2011 Spanish Superliga -  Champion, with CAI Voleibol Teruel

References

External links
 CAI Voleibol Teruel Website
 Italian League Profile
 FIVB Profile
 

1979 births
Living people
BYU Cougars men's volleyball players
Dominican Republic expatriate sportspeople in Germany
Dominican Republic expatriate sportspeople in Puerto Rico
Dominican Republic expatriate sportspeople in Spain
Dominican Republic expatriate sportspeople in Italy
Dominican Republic men's volleyball players
Expatriate volleyball players in Germany
Expatriate volleyball players in Israel
Expatriate volleyball players in Italy
Expatriate volleyball players in Spain
Expatriate volleyball players in Turkey
Expatriate volleyball players in Puerto Rico
Dominican Republic expatriate sportspeople in Israel
Expatriate volleyball players in the United States
Dominican Republic expatriate sportspeople in the United States
Expatriate volleyball players in France
Dominican Republic expatriate sportspeople in France